Central Electro Chemical Research Institute is one of a chain of forty national laboratories under the aegis of the Council of Scientific and Industrial Research (CSIR) in New Delhi. Founded on 25 July 1948 at Karaikudi in Tamil Nadu, CECRI came into existence in January 1953.

Regional Centres
CECRI Chennai Unit, CSIR Complex, TTTI, Taramani, Chennai
CECRI Corrosion Research Centre, Mandapam Camp

References

External links
CECRI Homepage
CECRI B.Tech Alumni Association
C. Jaishankar "", The Hindu, 31 August 2008.

Chemical research institutes
Materials science institutes
Council of Scientific and Industrial Research
Metallurgical industry in India
Research institutes in Tamil Nadu
Education in Sivaganga district
Karaikudi
Research institutes established in 1948
1948 establishments in India